Dobrova pri Prihovi is a small settlement in the Municipality of Oplotnica in eastern Slovenia. The area is part of the traditional region of Styria. It is now included in the Drava Statistical Region.

Name
The settlement was named Dobrova until 1998, when it was renamed Dobrova pri Prihovi (literally, 'Dobrova near Prihova') to differentiate it from other settlements with the same name. The name Dobrova is shared with several other places in Slovenia and is derived from Common Slavic *dǫbrova 'place where there is a deciduous or oak forest', in turn derived from *dǫbъ 'deciduous tree, oak'. Like similar names (e.g., Dobrovce, Dobrovnik, Zadobrova), it originally referred to the local vegetation.

References

External links
Dobrova pri Prihovi on Geopedia

Populated places in the Municipality of Oplotnica